William James Finley  (1863–1912) was a 19th-century professional baseball player. He played catcher and outfielder for the 1886 New York Giants. He attended Columbia University and Manhattan College.

Death
Finley died at age 49 from a heart attack in 1912. He is laid to rest in Calvary Cemetery.

References

External links

1863 births
1912 deaths
Major League Baseball catchers
Major League Baseball outfielders
New York Giants (NL) players
19th-century baseball players
Columbia Lions baseball players
Manhattan Jaspers baseball players
Baseball players from New York (state)
Columbia College (New York) alumni
Burials at Calvary Cemetery (Queens)